Washington County High School may refer to any of the following United States educational institutions:
Washington County High School (Alabama) in Chatom, Alabama
Washington County High School (Georgia) in Sandersville, Georgia
Washington County High School (Kentucky) in Springfield, Kentucky

See also
Booker T. Washington High School (disambiguation)
George Washington High School (disambiguation)
Washington High School (disambiguation)